Zhao Shengbo (Simplified Chinese:, born 14 April 1982) is a Chinese sports shooter from Zhaotong. He competed in the men's 50 metre rifle prone event at the 2016 Summer Olympics.

References

External links
 

1982 births
Living people
Chinese male sport shooters
Olympic shooters of China
Shooters at the 2016 Summer Olympics
Sport shooters from Yunnan
People from Zhaotong
Asian Games medalists in shooting
Asian Games gold medalists for China
Shooters at the 2014 Asian Games
Medalists at the 2014 Asian Games
21st-century Chinese people